Roel Rothkrans (born 31 January 1979) is a Dutch retired handball player.

Career
He went through the youth academy of Vlug en Lenig and was part of the first team from 1995 to 2001. In 2001 he moved to BFC where he played until 2005. After this he returned to Vlug en Lenig where he ended his playing career in 2008.

After his career as a player, he became a coach and trained the second men's team of Vlug en Lenig from 2008, coming out in the 2nd Division. After the championship in this class with this team (2012), he stopped as an active trainer for a number of years. In 2016 he again became assistant coach of the women's team of Vlug en Lenig, succeeding Nick Onink.

References

External links

Dutch handball coaches
1979 births
Living people
People from Geleen
Dutch male handball players
Sportspeople from Limburg (Netherlands)